Sabine Lisicki was the defending champion, but withdrew because of a left abdominal sprain. Roberta Vinci defeated Jelena Janković 7–5, 6–3 in the final to win the tournament.

Seeds

Draw

Finals

Top half

Bottom half

Qualifying draw

Seeds

Qualifiers

Lucky loser
  Emily Webley-Smith

First qualifier

Second qualifier

Third qualifier

Fourth qualifier

References
Main Draw
Qualifying Draw

2012 WTA Tour
2012 Women's Singles